João Pedro Gomes Ricciulli (born 10 October 1999) is a Bissau-Guinean professional footballer who plays as a centre-back for Vitória B and the Guinea-Bissau national team.

Club career
Ricciulli is a youth product of Sporting CP since 2014, and began his senior career with their reserves in the Campeonato de Portugal in 2020. On 10 August 2021, he transferred to Vitória B as they started in the Liga 3.

International career
Ricciulli debuted with Guinea-Bissau in a friendly 3–0 win over Equatorial Guinea on 23 March 2022.

Personal life
Ricciulli's twin brother, João Cláudio, is also a professional footballer.

References

External links
 

1999 births
Living people
Sportspeople from Bissau
Bissau-Guinean footballers
Guinea-Bissau international footballers
Association football defenders
Sporting CP B players
Vitória S.C. B players
Campeonato de Portugal (league) players
Bissau-Guinean expatriate footballers
Bissau-Guinean expatriates in Portugal
Expatriate footballers in Portugal
Twin sportspeople